Talismania is a genus of slickheads.

Species
There are currently 11 recognized species in this genus:
 Talismania antillarum (Goode & T. H. Bean, 1896) (Antillean smooth-head)
 Talismania aphos (W. A. Bussing, 1965)
 Talismania bifurcata (A. E. Parr, 1951) (Threadfin slickhead)
 Talismania brachycephala Sazonov, 1981
 Talismania bussingi Sazonov, 1989
 Talismania filamentosa Okamura & Kawanishi, 1984
 Talismania homoptera (Vaillant, 1888) (Hairfin smooth-head)
 Talismania kotlyari Sazonov & Ivanov, 1980
 Talismania longifilis (A. B. Brauer, 1902) (Longtail slickhead)
 Talismania mekistonema Sulak, 1975 (Threadfin smooth-head)
 Talismania okinawensis Okamura & Kawanishi, 1984

References

Alepocephalidae
Marine fish genera
Taxa named by George Brown Goode
Taxa named by Tarleton Hoffman Bean